Highway 29 is a provincial highway in Saskatchewan, Canada. It runs from Highway 14 at Wilkie to Highway 40 just west of Battleford.

Highway 29 originally continued south from Wilkie to Kelfield and Plenty; however, it was decommissioned in the 1940s. The former section is now designated as Highway 657.

Major intersections
From south to north:

References

029